Li Yi (born 1 January 1992) is a professional wushu taolu athlete from Macau.

Career 
Li started practising wushu at the age of eight in Anhui.

Li's first international debut was at the 2013 World Wushu Championships where she won a silver medal in duilian. A year later, she competed in the 2014 Asian Games and won the silver medal in women's jianshu and qiangshu. At the 2015 World Wushu Championships, she qualified for the 2016 Taolu World Cup and went on to win a gold medal in jianshu and two bronze medals in changquan and qiangshu. In the 2017 World Wushu Championships, she earned another two bronze medals in changquan and duilian, and later at the 2017 Summer Universiade, she was a double gold medallist in changquan and jianshu, the first two and only two medals Macau has ever earned at the Universiade. 

In 2018, she returned to the Taolu World Cup and won two silver medals. Later that same year, she competed in the 2018 Asian Games and won the silver medal in women's changquan. In the 2019 World Wushu Championships, she won two gold medals in jianshu and qiangshu and a silver medal in changquan, making her one of the most successful athletes in the competition.

Honours 
Awarded by the Macau SAR Government

 Honourific Title of Merit: 2012, 2014

 : 2018
Macau Outstanding Athletes Election
 Honourary Athletes Awards: Elected 2017, 2019

See also 

 List of Asian Games medalists in wushu

References

External links 

 Athlete profile at the 2018 Asian Games

1992 births
Living people
Macau female wushu practitioners
Wushu practitioners at the 2014 Asian Games
Wushu practitioners at the 2018 Asian Games
Medalists at the 2014 Asian Games
Medalists at the 2018 Asian Games
Asian Games silver medalists for Macau
Asian Games medalists in wushu
Sportspeople from Hebei
Medalists at the 2017 Summer Universiade